Mbulelo Budaza (born 6 September 1993) is a South African cricketer. He was included in the Griqualand West cricket team squad for the 2015 Africa T20 Cup. He was the joint-leading wicket-taker in the 2019–20 Momentum One Day Cup, with eighteen dismissals in eight matches. In April 2021, he was named in Free State's squad, ahead of the 2021–22 cricket season in South Africa.

References

External links
 

1993 births
Living people
South African cricketers
Border cricketers
Griqualand West cricketers
Northern Cape cricketers
People from Makhanda, Eastern Cape
Cricketers from the Eastern Cape
Free State cricketers